Heath (or The Heath) is a dispersed hamlet in north Herefordshire, England.

Two equidistant routes between Leintwardine and Heath are possible: via the B-roads and Broadward Bridge, or via Jay Bridge (both bridges crossing the Clun).

The hamlets of Heath and nearby Jay formed a single township and whilst in the present day form part of the civil parish of Leintwardine, and thus a part of Herefordshire, they were regarded as being part of Shropshire until the mid-19th century.

Heath Farm is a large farm with eight recently constructed chicken breeding barns (situated by the Heart of Wales Line). The area was until recently dominated by arable farming, but today is much more diversified.

Heath House is a country house and has extensive stables for horses. The Heath House estate has a number of houses and substantial outbuildings in proximity to the main house. In 1987 Simon Dale, a retired architect was murdered in Heath House. The murder remains unsolved.

The B4367 road passes between Heath House and Heath Farm (to its west). At the north end of the settlement is Heath Lodge, a house with a thatched-roof, situated at the junction of the B4367 and B4385 roads, right on the border with Shropshire.

To the north is the larger settlement of Hopton Heath (in Shropshire) with its railway station, to the southwest is the small village of Bedstone (in Shropshire), and to the east is the hamlet of Broadward (again, in Shropshire).

References

Hamlets in Herefordshire
Places formerly in Shropshire